Eucereon clementsi is a moth of the subfamily Arctiinae. It was described by Schaus in 1892. It is found on St. Lucia in the West Indies.

References

clementsi
Moths described in 1892